Lophiotoma is a genus of sea snails, marine gastropod mollusks in the family Turridae, the turrids.

Fossils of this genus have been found in many places in the Indo-Pacific, but also going as far back as 61.7 Ma in paleocene strata of Alabama, USA.

Original description
Although having the small smooth embryo of a single whorl, polished surface and obsolete lines of growth, characterizing Pleurotoma (now Turris), this genus may be recognized at once by the relatively shorter and stouter form as a rule, less elongate and straighter beak, which is strongly tapering in certain large forms like line unedo, finer, more acutely elevated and less close-set spiral carinae, with a usually distinct and even, finely lineolate concavity from the peripheral carina to the suture or subsutural collar, the latter being generally present and by the deep anal sinus formed centrally on, and not behind, the peripheral carina, the latter being more strongly elevated and 
usually subduplex.

Species
Species within the genus Lophiotoma include:
 Lophiotoma abbreviata (Reeve, 1843)
 Lophiotoma acuta (Perry, 1811)
 Lophiotoma bisaya Olivera, 2004
 Lophiotoma bratasusa Puillandre, Fedosov, Zaharias, Aznar-Cormano & Kantor, 2017
 Lophiotoma brevicaudata (Reeve, 1843) 
 Lophiotoma capricornica Olivera, 2004
 Lophiotoma dickkilburni Olivera, 2004
 Lophiotoma friedrichbonhoefferi Olivera, 2004
 Lophiotoma hejingorum Stahlschmidt, Poppe & Tagaro, 2018
 Lophiotoma jickelii (Weinkauff, 1875)
 Lophiotoma kina Puillandre, Fedosov, Zaharias, Aznar-Cormano & Kantor, 2017
 Lophiotoma koolhoveni (Oostingh, 1938)
 Lophiotoma leucotropis (A. Adams & Reeve, 1850)
 Lophiotoma madagascarensis Olivera, 2004
 Lophiotoma natalensis Bozzetti, 2016
 Lophiotoma panglaoensis Olivera, 2004
 Lophiotoma picturata (Weinkauff, 1876)
 Lophiotoma polytropa (Helbling, 1779)
 Lophiotoma pseudoannulata Dell, 1990
 Lophiotoma pseudocosmoi Baoquan Li & Xinzheng Li, 2008
 Lophiotoma ruthveniana (Melvill, 1923)
 Lophiotoma semfala Puillandre, Fedosov, Zaharias, Aznar-Cormano & Kantor, 2017
 Lophiotoma tayabasensis Olivera, 2004
 Lophiotoma verticala Baoquan Li & Xinzheng Li, 2008
 Lophiotoma vezzaroi Cossignani, 2015
Species brought into synonymy
 Lophiotoma albina (Lamarck, 1822): synonym of Gemmula albina (Lamarck, 1822)
 Lophiotoma babylonia (Linnaeus, 1758): synonym of Turris babylonia (Linnaeus, 1758)
 Lophiotoma cerithiformis : synonym of Daphnella lirata (Reeve, 1845) 
 Lophiotoma cingulifera (Lamarck, 1822): synonym of Iotyrris cingulifera (Lamarck, 1822)
 Lophiotoma indica (Röding, 1798): synonym of Unedogemmula indica (Röding, 1798)
 Lophiotoma notata (G.B. Sowerby III, 1889): synonym of Iotyrris notata (G. B. Sowerby III, 1889)
 Lophiotoma olangoensis Olivera, 2002: synonym of Iotyrris olangoensis (Olivera, 2002) (original combination)
 Lophiotoma tigrina Lamarck, 1822: synonym of Lophiotoma acuta (Perry, 1811)
 Lophiotoma (Xenuroturris) incredula Iredale, T., 1931: synonym of Iotyrris cingulifera cingulifera (Lamarck, J.B.P.A. de, 1822)

References

 Kilburn, R.N. (1983) Turridae (Mollusca: Gastropoda) of southern Africa and Mozambique. Part 1. Subfamily Turrinae. Annals of the Natal Museum, 25, 549–585
 A. K. Dey. 1961. The Miocene Mollusca from Quilon, Kerala (India). Palaeontologica Indica 36
 H. S. Ladd. 1982. Cenozoic fossil mollusks from Western Pacific Islands; Gastropods (Volutidae through Terebridae). United States Geological Survey Professional Paper 1171:1-100
 F. S. MacNeil. 1960. Tertiary and Quaternary Gastropoda of Okinawa: A comparison of the late Miocene, Pliocene, and Pleistocene Gastropoda of Okinawa with related faunas of East Asia together with a resume of the geological setting of the fossiliferous deposits. United States Geological Survey Professional Paper 339:1-148
 J. J. Sepkoski. 2002. A compendium of fossil marine animal genera. Bulletins of American Paleontology 363:1-560

External links
 A.W.B. Powell, The family Turridae in the Indo-Pacific. Part 1. The subfamily Turrinae; Indo-Pacific mollusca, vol. 1 pages: 227--346
  Tucker, J.K. 2004 Catalog of recent and fossil turrids (Mollusca: Gastropoda). Zootaxa 682:1-1295.
 Olivera, Baldomero. "Larger forms in Lophiotoma: four new species described in the Philippines and three from elsewhere in the Indo-Pacific." Science Diliman 16.1 (2004).
 Puillandre N., Fedosov A.E., Zaharias P., Aznar-Cormano L. & Kantor Y.I. (2017). A quest for the lost types of Lophiotoma (Gastropoda: Conoidea: Turridae): integrative taxonomy in a nomenclatural mess. Zoological Journal of the Linnean Society. 181: 243-271
 Worldwide Mollusc Species Data Base: Turridae

Taxa named by Thomas Lincoln Casey Jr.